The first lady of Lagos State is the advisor to the Lagos State governor, and often plays a role in social activism.  The position is traditionally held by the wife of the Lagos State governor, concurrent with his term of office,
although the Constitution of Nigeria does not recognize the office of the first lady.

The current first lady is Ibijoke Sanwo-Olu. At present, there are eight living former first ladies: Taiwo Adefunmilayo Lawal, wife of Adekunle Lawal; Christine Nwanyife Kanu ex-wife of late Godwin Ndubuisi Kanu, Lady Doja, widow of Michael Otedola; Omolola Oyinlola, wife of Olagunsoye Oyinlola; Munira Marwa, wife of Mohammed Buba Marwa; Oluremi Tinubu, wife of Bola Tinubu; Abimbola Fashola, wife of Babatunde Raji Fashola; and Bolanle Ambode, wife of Akinwunmi Ambode

References